Grande-Anse is a quartier of Terre-de-Bas Island, located in Îles des Saintes archipelago in the Caribbean. It is located in the eastern part of the island. The most beautiful beach of the island is located there. Some grocery, bakery and restaurant are located on this village.

To See
the beach of Grande-Anse: white sand beach with restaurants and bars.

Populated places in Îles des Saintes
Quartiers of Îles des Saintes